The Andirá River is a river of Amazonas state in northern Brazil.

See also
List of rivers of Amazonas (Brazilian state)

References

Rivers of Amazonas (Brazilian state)